The Council of Ministers (often abbreviated informally to "CoMin") is the principal executive organ of the Isle of Man Government. Its role is similar to, though not identical with, that of the Cabinet in the United Kingdom. Until 1990, its title was the Executive Council.

The Executive Council, chaired by the Lieutenant Governor and including members of Tynwald, was established in 1949, and gradually thereafter became the effective government of the Island. The Lieutenant Governor ceased to chair the Executive Council in 1980, being replaced by a chairman elected by Tynwald, and the Council was reconstituted in 1985 to include the chairmen of the eight principal boards of Tynwald; in 1986, they were given the title Minister and the chairman was styled Chief Minister. In 1990, the Council was renamed the Council of Ministers.

The Council of Ministers consists of the Chief Minister and not more than nine ministers.  The Chief Minister must be a Member of the House of Keys and ministers must be members of Tynwald.  Originally, the Chief Minister was appointed by the Lieutenant Governor on the nomination of Tynwald.  On 20 March 2018 this changed so that the Chief Minister is appointed by the Lieutenant Governor on the nomination of and from among the members of House of Keys, as it is the directly elected chamber.  Ministers are appointed by the Lieutenant Governor, acting on the advice of and with the concurrence of the Chief Minister. The Chief Minister assigns a minister to each department of the Isle of Man Government.  The Council of Ministers must command the confidence of 16 members of the House of Keys.

Current membership
Chief Minister (Ard-shirveishagh) – Alfred Cannan MHK
Minister for the Cabinet Office (Shirveishagh son Oik Coonceil ny Shirveishee) - Kate Lord-Brennan MHK
Minister for Education, Sport and Culture (Shirveishagh son Ynsee, Spoyrt as Cultoor) – Julie Edge MHK
Minister for Enterprise (Shirveishagh son Gostid Dellal) – Tim Johnston MHK
Minister for Environment, Food and Agriculture (Shirveishagh son Chymmyltaght, Bee as Eirinys) – Clare Barber MHK
Minister for Health and Social Care (Shirveishagh son Slaynt as Kiarail y Theay) –  Lawrie Hooper MHK
Minister for Justice and Home Affairs (Shirveishagh son Jeerys as Cooishyn Sthie) – Jane Poole-Wilson MHK
Minister for Infrastructure (Shirveishagh son Bun-troggalys) – Chris Thomas MHK
Minister for the Treasury (Shirveishagh Tashtee) – Alex Allinson MHK

Current and historical composition of Council of Ministers / Executive Council

Structure of the Council of Ministers effective from 1 April 2014

Structure of the Council of Ministers from 1 April 2010 – 31 March 2014 

 ^ This was a temporary appointment and Juan Watterson MHK remained a non-assigned minister during the period between 3 and 12 September 2012.
 ^ This was an interim appointment following the dismissal of Peter Karran MHK.

Structure of the Executive Council / Council of Ministers from 16 December 1986 – 31 March 2010

See also
Executive Council (Commonwealth countries)
Executive Council of the Isle of Man
Isle of Man Government

References

External links
 Isle of Man Government - Council of Ministers
Tynwald - Members
MHKs They Work for You 

Government of the Isle of Man
Isle of Man